The Cartha Queens Park Rugby Football Club is a rugby union side based in Glasgow, Scotland. It was founded in 1974, after the merger of Cartha RFC and Queens Park F.P.  They play their home games at Dumbreck.

History

Cartha Athletic Club was founded in 1889. The 'athletic' club played a number of sports: Cricket, Athletics, Rugby, Tennis, Hockey... the association was henced named Cartha. The rugby union section was established in 1906. In 1974 Cartha RFC and Queens Park F.P. merged to form the present day rugby union club.

The club runs four adult XVs catering for all abilities and levels of experience. At Dumbreck there is an impressive youth section catering for over 200 local children aged 5 to 17. The club also has a senior women's side currently competing in the Scottish Women's Premier League at Premier 1 level.

Current 1st XV Squad 

2022-23 Season

Notable former players 
Former CQPRFC players include current Glasgow Warriors and Scotland stand-off Ruaridh Jackson.

Glasgow City Sevens 

Cartha Queen's Park play host to the Glasgow City Sevens tournament at Dumbreck. This was originally known as the Cartha Sevens. The first rugby sevens tournament took place in April 1935 and continued for the following two years. After a break, for the Second World War period, the Cartha Sevens were reintroduced in 1950 and has then been played in all the subsequent years. On the merger of Cartha RFC and Queens Park F.P. in 1974 the tournament became known as the Cartha Queens Park Sevens. The Cartha Queens Park tournament was renamed to the Glasgow City Sevens Tournament in 2005.

Honours

Men
 BT National League 2
 Champions:  2016-17
 Glasgow City Sevens
 Champions (3): 1980, 1981, 1983
 Glasgow University Sevens
 Champions: 1984, 1985
 Helensburgh Sevens
 Champions: 1983, 1984
 Lenzie Sevens
 Champions: 1985, 1988
 Old Aloysians Sevens
 Champions: 1976
 Moray Sevens
 Champions: 1994

Women

 Mull Sevens
 Champions: 2009, 2010, 2011

References 

Rugby union in Glasgow
Scottish rugby union teams
Pollokshields
Rugby clubs established in 1974
1974 establishments in Scotland